The Nokia E50 Business Device is a bar-style monoblock quad-band smartphone from Nokia announced 18 May 2006 as part of the Eseries, intended primarily for the corporate business market. It includes sophisticated e-mail support for Nokia's Intellisync Wireless Email, BlackBerry Connect, Visto Mobile, Activesync Mail for Exchange, Altexia as well as IMAP4. It also has the ability to view Microsoft Word, PowerPoint, and Excel attachments, and PDF documents but it cannot be used for editing these without additional apps. An application manager downloads, removes and installs both Nokia and third-party applications.  Device to device synchronization is possible with Data transfer application. Features include EDGE, Bluetooth 2.0, a 1,280 × 960 pixels (1.3-megapixel) camera, a MicroSD memory-card slot, and digital music and video player functionality through RealPlayer and Flash Player.  This unit does not support UMTS, Wi-Fi, or FM radio.

It uses the third edition of the Series 60 user-interface (S60v3) and the Symbian operating system version 9.1. It is not binary compatible with software compiled for earlier versions of the Symbian operating system.

Versions
Check firmware
 *#0000#
V 07.36.0.0
 Nokia model E50-1 / RM-170 (with camera)
 Nokia model E50-2 / RM-171 (without camera)
 Nokia model E50 Metal Black, available in selected markets.

Specifications sheet

BT profiles
Audio
 AVCTP-CT (Audio/Video Control Transport Protocol Controller)
 AVCTP-TG (Audio/Video Control Transport Protocol Target)
 AVRCP-TG (Audio Video Remote Control TG)
 GAVDP-ACP (Generic Audio/Video Distribution Profile Acceptor)
 GAVDP-INT (Generic Audio Video Distribution Initiator)
 HandsFree-AG (1.0) (HandsFree Audio Gateway)
 Headset-AG (Headset Audio Gateway)
 SIM Access-Server 
File transfer
 FT-Server (File Transfer Server)
Photo
 BIP-ImagePush (Basic Imaging)
Generic
 GAP (Generic Access)
Internet/LAN
 DUN-GW (Dial-Up Networking Gateway)
 PAN-AP (Personal Area Networking Access Point)
 PAN-Group
Serial communication
 Serial-DevA
 Serial-DevB
Control
 HID-Host (Human Interface Device Host)
Business card
 OPP Client (Object Push Profile)
 OPP Server

See also
 Smartphone
 Nokia Eseries

References

External links

 Nokia E50 – Product Page
 Nokia E50 – Resource Information
 Nokia E50 – Device Details
 Bluetooth Qualification Program specifications
 Repair Video

Reviews, photos and videos
 Nokia E50 – Review by Mobile-Review
 Nokia E50 – Review by phoneArena.com
 Nokia E50 – Review by GSM Arena, Video
 Nokia E50 – Review by About-nokia.com 
 Nokia E50 – Preview by All About Symbian
 Nokia E50 – Review by CNET: UK
 Nokia E50 – Review by Tech2 India
 Nokia E50 – Review by Steve Punter's Southern Ontario Cell Phone Page
 Nokia E50 – Unofficial Live Photos of 'Metal Black' model
 Nokia E50 – Official Photos of 'Metal Black' model
 Nokia E50 – Official Photos
 Nokia E50 – Official Video

S60 (software platform)
Nokia ESeries
Mobile phones with infrared transmitter

de:Nokia Eseries#Nokia E50
pt:Nokia E50